Henry Williamson Pell (c. 1881August 22, 1949) was an American football player and banker. He was the captain of the Princeton Tigers football teams in 1900 and 1901. He worked for the United States Trust Company for 37 years and served as its president and chairman.

Early years
Pell was born in Goshen, New York, and grew up in Brooklyn.  He attended the Brooklyn Polytechnic Preparatory School before enrolling at Princeton University.  Pell played college football for the Princeton Tigers football team from 1899 to 1901.  He played at the tackle position and was selected by the New York Post as a second-team All-American in 1901.  He was also the captain of the Princeton football teams in both 1900 and 1901.  Pell was six feet, 1 inch tall and weighed 175 pounds as a football player at Princeton.

Business career
After graduating from Princeton in 1902, he received a degree from New York Law School in 1904.  He practiced law in New York from 1904 to 1912.  In 1912, Pell joined the United States Trust Company of New York.  He remained with the United States Trust Company for 37 years, serving as its president from 1938 to 1947.  He continued to serve as the company's chairman of the board until his death in 1949 at age 68.

References

1880s births
1949 deaths
All-American college football players
American bankers
Princeton Tigers football players
New York Law School alumni
People from Goshen, New York
Sportspeople from Brooklyn
Players of American football from New York City